Kostyantyn Petrovych Vizyonok (born 27 March 1976) is a former Ukrainian football player.

He scored 3 goals for FC Baltika Kaliningrad in the 1998 UEFA Intertoto Cup, helping them to advance to the third round on the only occasion Baltika participated in the European competition.

References

1976 births
People from Armyansk Municipality
Living people
Ukrainian footballers
FC Tytan Armyansk players
Ukrainian expatriate footballers
Expatriate footballers in Russia
FC Baltika Kaliningrad players
Russian Premier League players
Maccabi Ironi Kiryat Ata F.C. players
Expatriate footballers in Israel
Hapoel Rishon LeZion F.C. players
FC Helios Kharkiv players
FC Stal Kamianske players
FC Komunalnyk Luhansk players
Association football forwards
FC Sportakademklub Moscow players
Ukrainian expatriate sportspeople in Israel